Łukasz Żal (born 24 June 1981) is a Polish cinematographer, best known for his work on the films Ida (2014), Loving Vincent (2017) and Cold War (2018).

Life and career
Żal has said that he "fell in love" with cinema at the age of 16, when he attended a course on filmmaking held at a local gymnasium in his home town of Koszalin, Poland. His interest in photography was sparked by a friend, who asked to use him as a subject and also showed him how to use a camera. He went on to study photography at the Leon Schiller National Film, Television and Theatre School in Łódź, from which he graduated in 2007. Whilst there, he watched many films and decided to pursue a career as a cinematographer because of the "stronger emotional content" he observed in movies.

When preparing to work on a film, Zal has stated that he reads though the script and tries "to find part of [him]self in the movie".

In 2019 he was made an Honorary Fellow of the British Royal Photographic Society, from whom he also received the annual Lumière Award.

Filmography
Short Films

Feature Films

Awards and nominations

Major awards

Critics awards

See also
Cinema of Poland
List of Polish Academy Award winners and nominees
List of Poles

References

External links
 Łukasz Żal at FilmPolski.pl
 Łukasz Żal at Filmweb.pl

1981 births
Living people
21st-century Polish cinematographers
European Film Award for Best Cinematographer winners
People from Koszalin